Jean-Paul Viguier (born 4 May 1946) is a French architect.  He is considered one of the world's leading architects and one of the few French ones to work extensively outside of Europe.

Early works 
Graduated from the École nationale supérieure des Beaux-Arts in 1970, Jean-Paul Viguier, with Jean Bossu and Georges-Henri Pingusson, founded the teaching unit n°5. 3 years later, he received a "master of city planning in urban design" at the Harvard Graduate School of Design from Harvard University, and, as he came back in France, he hosted a section of urban architecture in the journal Urbanisme. From 1975-1992, projects were carried out in association with Jean-François Jodry. In 1981, he won the "first prize of the jury" in the competition for the Opera Bastille and then, in 1983, the "first tie price" for the project head Defense. In 1986, he won alongside Alain Provost, Patrick Berger and Gilles Clément, the competition for the construction of the Parc André-Citroën in Paris, whose creation will last 6 years (1992-2002) soon after they won the Seville Expo’92 contest for the French Pavilion.

In 1988, he designed The Atrium : headquarters of the Caisse des Depots et Consignations in Boulogne-Billancourt. In 1990, he won the competition organized by the Public Establishment for the development of the Defence area for the construction of the Heart defense complex at the Esso headquarters location. Then he realized the headquarters of France Télévisions in Paris, as well as many others, such as Alstom in Saint-Ouen and AstraZeneca and Bristol-Myers Squibb in Rueil-Malmaison.

Jean-Paul Viguier et Associés practice 
Jean-Paul Viguier Architecture and Associates works on a very wide range of building types.

In the area of housing, with achievements in Paris (Bercy, Dupleix), Créteil, Asnieres-sur-Seine, Clichy and recently (in 2009) in the 15th district of the capital, rue de la Convention. In the cultural field, the firm realized the Cathedral library (now named "Jean-Falala") at Reims in 2002, and restructured the Natural History Museum of Toulouse. She also designed urban facilities such as the layout of the site of the Pont du Gard and built an archaeological museum on the same site in 2000.

The fields of activity of the practice is completed by the making of office buildings, as Angle in Boulogne-Billancourt (2008), seat of the Journal L'Équipe, the headquarters of IBM Europe in Bois-Colombes (2009), the seat of Prisma Presse inGennevilliers or Heart Mediterranean, the islet of D3 ZAC Joliette Marseille (2008). Finally, the Majunga tower is located in the heart of La Défense.

In the same time, the agency develops an international activity: taking care of  the construction of the Hotel Sofitel Water Tower in Chicago for Accor in 2002 and working in a draft new city in Malaysia. In spring 2008, in Budapest central square, the Vorosmarty Plaza Project was opened to the public: a mixed building dressed in a glass envelope. In June 2008, the McNay Museum of Art in San Antonio, the first American modern art museum built by a French architect, was inaugurated. The agency also worked in Morocco at the construction of the headquarters of Morocco Telecom in Rabat in 2009.

As it is rightly noted on their website: “The agency has thus shown an ability to build in various parts of the world and strives to bring to its projects the best possible responses to the relationship between buildings and their environment.”

Awards and personal titles 
 Member of the High Commission of Historical Monuments.
 Knight of the Legion of Honour since 15 April 2003 he was promoted to officer of the Legion of Honor on 14 July 2011.
 Commander of the Order of Arts and Letters.
 Knight of the National Order of Merit.
Jean-Paul Viguier was awarded the grand prize of  the Cities Monitor for the Parc André-Citroën, got a mention for the prix de l’equerre d’Argent of Architecture for his  industrial hotel activity building  rue d ' Aubervilliers in Paris19th, and the Architectural Record-Business Week Award in New York for the head office of Astra Pharmaceutical Headquarters in Rueil-Malmaison. The Sofitel Chicago Water Tower has received "the best building since ten years award" in 2003 by the AIA Chicago; This building is listed among the "150 favorite buildings of America" by the American Institute of Architects, and got the MIPIM Award in 2005. The Pont du Gard has the ”Grand site de France " label.

He has been elected member of the Academy of Architecture since 1993, academy for which he was president from 1999 to 2002. He is also a founding member of AFEX (French Architects for export). He was appointed "honorary Fellow" of the AIA (American Institute of Architects) in 2001 and Honorary Professor of Tongji University in Shanghai, China.

Furthermore, a majority of his firm projects are frequently awarded for environmental distinctions and certifications : BREEAM, BBC, HQE.

Notable works

 1992 France Pavilion at the World Exhibition in Seville
 1997 Social Headquarters Alstom Transport Alstom in Saint-Ouen
 1997 AstraZeneca Pharmaceutical social headquarter, Rueil-Malmaison. (for which he will receive the award Business Week / Architectural Record 1999 - American Institute of Architect)
 1998 France television Headquarters, Paris
 2000 Landscaping around the Pont du Gard
 2000 Parc André-Citroën in Paris.
 2001 Coeur Defense towers, La Défense. 
 2002 Headquarters BMS (Bristol Myers Squibb) / UPSA in Rueil-Malmaison
 2002 Media Cathedral, Reims.
 2002 Shopping center, Carré Sénart.
 2002 Sofitel Chicago Water Tower, Chicago, USA
 2004  Ilot M7, office building including the Ministry of Sports, and shops. Paris
 2005 Hotel Novotel Le Havre.
 2008 Office building, housing, shops, parking, Vorosmarty Square, Budapest, Hungary
 2008 Natural History Museum of Toulouse, Toulouse.
 2008 Mcnay art Museum extension, San Antonio, Texas, United States
 2008 ZAC de la Joliette, Block D3, Heart Mediterranean, Marseille
 2008 Zac Seguin Lot A1, Angle Building, Boulogne-Billancourt
 2009 Residential building, Paris 15th Convention
 2009 Sodexho France headquarters,  Guyancourt in the Yvelines
 2010 Hospital Castres Mazamet.
 2012 Leisure Pole, Lyon Confluence,
 2012 Morocco Telecom tower, Rabat, Morocco
 2013 University Cancer Institute, Cancéropole Toulouse
 2013 SFR Headquarters in Saint-Denis
 2013 UGC theatre, Paris
 2014 Majunga tower La Defense
 2014 Amphitheatre district, Metz
 2014 Holon, urban park in Israel

For further information about the projects go to the Firm Website

References

Harvard University people
Harvard University alumni
Harvard Graduate School of Design alumni
1946 births
People from Haute-Garonne
Living people
École des Beaux-Arts alumni
20th-century French architects
21st-century French architects
Members of the Académie d'architecture
Commandeurs of the Ordre des Arts et des Lettres
Knights of the Ordre national du Mérite
Officiers of the Légion d'honneur